A referendum on changing the territory's name was held in South Ossetia on 9 April 2017, alongside presidential elections. It was approved by 79.53%. The constitution will be amended to denominate the formal name of the country from "Republic of South Ossetia" to "Republic of South Ossetia–the State of Alania", referencing Alania, a state built by the Alan people. Modern Ossetians are descended from the Alans, although the name Ossetian is of Georgian origin (although the Georgian root word  is itself from an Alanic autonym).

Background
In a move towards integration with the Russian Federation, South Ossetian President Leonid Tibilov proposed in December 2015 a name change to "South Ossetia–Alania", in analogy with "North Ossetia–Alania", a Russian federal subject. Tibilov furthermore suggested holding a referendum on joining the Russian Federation prior to April 2017, which would lead to a united "Ossetia–Alania".  In April 2016, Tibilov said he intended to hold the referendum before August of that year. However, on 30 May, Tibilov postponed the referendum until after the presidential election due in April 2017.

Results

References

2017 in South Ossetia
2017 referendums
South Ossetia
April 2017 events in Europe
2017